This is a sortable table of the approximately 2,162 townlands in County Tyrone, Northern Ireland.

Duplicate names occur where there is more than one townland with the same name in the county. Names marked in bold typeface are towns and villages, and the word Town appears for those entries in the Acres column.

 

A

B

C

D

E

F

G

H

I

K

L

M

N

O

P

Q

R

S

T

U

W

References

 
Tyrone
Tyrone
Tyrone
Townlands